The Laird o Drum is Child ballad number 236. It is found in six versions, A to F, all based on Alexander Irvine's courtship of and marriage to Margaret Coutts, his second wife.

Synopsis
The lord of Drum goes to woo a shepherd lass.  She does not believe him but sends him to her father, who gives his consent.  His brother claims that it disgraces the family.  The lord says that his brother wedded a wife to spend money, and he a wife to work and win; he had a lady of higher birth than he was, and she treated him as lowly.  When they are in bed, the shepherdess says they are now equal.  Once they were buried, no one would be able to tell their mould apart.

References

External links
The Laird o Drum

Child Ballads
Year of song unknown